William Thomas Victor Banks (9 February 1889 – 12 October 1972) was a New Zealand professional rugby league footballer who played in the 1910s. He played at representative level for New Zealand (Heritage № 108), and Hawke's Bay, as a forward (prior to the specialist positions of), during the era of contested scrums.

Playing career

Kia Ora club and Hawke's Bay
Banks debuted for the Kia Ora club in 1914. He was selected at the end of the season for the Hawke's Bay team to play Canterbury which they lost 10-8.

International honours
Banks represented New Zealand in 1914 against Great Britain on August 1. He played in the second row and scored a try in a 16-13 loss at the Auckland Domain before a crowd of 15,000.

References

External links
Statistics at rugbyleagueproject.org

1889 births
1972 deaths
Hawke's Bay rugby league team players
New Zealand national rugby league team players
New Zealand rugby league players
Place of birth missing
Place of death missing
Rugby league forwards
Rugby league players from Hawke's Bay Region